Lovongai Rural LLG (also spelled Lavongai) is a local government area in New Ireland Province, Papua New Guinea. The LLG administers the island of New Hanover and a few surrounding islands. The LLG is located in Kavieng District and the LLG headquarters is Taskul. Some population centres in the LLG are: Taskul, Patiagaga, Patipai, Ungakum, Tsoi, Tukulisava, and Ungalik. This LLG has 19 wards, comprising a population of 29,005 (Census 2011). Current LLG President is John Aini.

Wards
 Taskul
 Patiagaga
 Patipai
 Ungakum
 Tsoi
 Tukulisava
 Ungalik
 Meterankasing
 Noipuas
 Sosson
 Tingwon
 Umbukul
 Kone
 Meteselen
 Tioputuk
 Lovongai
 Meterangkang
 Lungatang
 Kulingei

References

Local-level governments of New Ireland Province